The 2020 KNSB Dutch Sprint Championships in speed skating were held in Heerenveen at the Thialf ice skating rink from 25 January to 26 January 2020. The tournament was part of the 2019–2020 speed skating season. Kjeld Nuis and Letitia de Jong won the sprint titles. The sprint championships were held at the same time as the 2020 KNSB Dutch Allround Championships.

Schedule

Medalist

Men's sprint

Women's sprint

Classification

Men's sprint

Women's sprint

Source:

References

KNSB Dutch Sprint Championships
KNSB Dutch Sprint Championships
2020 Sprint